Tiberiu Csik (born 12 December 1971) is a Romanian former professional footballer who played as a defender. After retirement Csik was associated for many years with his hometown team, Olimpia Satu Mare, in various positions ( main coach, youth coach, etc.), until the club was forced into dissolution in 2018. After leaving Olimpia, Csik had a brief stint with Csenger FC in Hungary followed by Vointa Lazuri back in Romania.

He is the older brother of former footballer Levente Csik.

Honours
Steaua București
Liga I (6): 1992–93, 1993–94, 1994–95, 1995–96, 1996–97, 1997–98
Cupa României (3): 1995–96, 1996–97, 1998–99
Supercupa României (3): 1994, 1995, 1998

References

External links
 
 

1971 births
Living people
Sportspeople from Satu Mare
Romanian footballers
Association football defenders
Liga I players
Liga II players
Nemzeti Bajnokság I players
FC Olimpia Satu Mare players
FC Politehnica Timișoara players
FC Steaua București players
CSM Jiul Petroșani players
Újpest FC players
AFC Rocar București players
Kaposvári Rákóczi FC players
FC Universitatea Cluj players
CS Minerul Lupeni players
Romanian expatriate footballers
Romanian expatriate sportspeople in Hungary
Expatriate footballers in Hungary
Romanian football managers
FC Olimpia Satu Mare managers